Takhini-Kopper King is an electoral district which returns a member (known as an MLA) to the Legislative Assembly of Yukon in Canada. It was created in 2009 out of much of the former riding of McIntyre-Takhini. The riding includes the Whitehorse subdivisions of Takhini and Raven's Ridge, as well as the Kopper King, Takhini, and Northland mobile home parks and the residences along the Fish Lake Road. Yukon University and the Whitehorse Correctional Centre Campus are also situated in this electoral district. However, inmates' votes are counted in their home district.

MLAs

Election results

2021 general election

2016 general election

|-

| NDP
| Kate White
| align="right"| 605
| align="right"| 46.1%
| align="right"| +0.2%

| Liberal
| Jeane Lassen
| align="right"| 478
| align="right"| 36.4%
| align="right"| +14.0%

|-
! align=left colspan=3|Total
! align=right| 1312
! align=right| 100.0%
! align=right| –
|}

2011 general election

|-

| NDP
| Kate White
| align="right"| 458
| align="right"| 45.9%
| align="right"| –

| Liberal
| Cherish Clarke
| align="right"| 224
| align="right"| 22.4%
| align="right"| –

|-
! align=left colspan=3|Total
! align=right| 998
! align=right| 100.0%
! align=right| –
|}

References

Yukon territorial electoral districts
Politics of Whitehorse
2009 establishments in Yukon